The project that became Firefox today began as an experimental branch of the Mozilla Suite called m/b (or mozilla/browser). Firefox retains the cross-platform nature of the original Mozilla browser, using the XUL user interface markup language. The use of XUL makes it possible to extend the browser's capabilities through the use of extensions and themes. The development and installation processes of these add-ons raised security concerns, and with the release of Firefox 0.9, the Mozilla Foundation opened a Mozilla Update website containing "approved" themes and extensions. The use of XUL sets Firefox apart from other browsers, including other projects based on Mozilla's Gecko layout engine and most other browsers, which use interfaces native to their respective platforms (Galeon and Epiphany use GTK+, K-Meleon uses MFC, and Camino uses Cocoa). Many of these projects started before Firefox, and probably served as inspiration.

Releases

Phoenix and Firebird 

Hyatt, Ross, Hewitt and Chanial developed their browser to combat the perceived software bloat of the Mozilla Suite (codenamed, internally referred to, and continued by the community as SeaMonkey), which integrated features such as IRC, mail, news, and WYSIWYG HTML editing into one internet suite. After it was sufficiently developed, binaries for public testing appeared in September 2002 under the name Phoenix. This name carried the implication of the mythical firebird that rose triumphantly from the ashes of its dead predecessor, in this case Netscape Navigator which lost the "First browser war" to Microsoft's Internet Explorer. The name Mozilla began as the internal codename for the original 1994 Netscape Navigator browser aiming to displace NCSA Mosaic as the world's most popular web browser. The name for this would-be "Mosaic killer" was meant to evoke the building-crushing Godzilla. The name Mozilla was revived as the 1998 open sourcing spinoff organization from Netscape.

The name Phoenix remained until April 14, 2003, when it was changed because of a trademark dispute with the BIOS manufacturer Phoenix Technologies (which produces a BIOS-based browser called Phoenix FirstWare Connect). The new name, Firebird, met with mixed reactions, particularly as the Firebird database server already carried the name. In response, the Mozilla Foundation stated that the browser should always bear the name Mozilla Firebird to avoid confusion with the database software.

Firefox 

Due to continuing pressure from the Firebird community, on February 9, 2004, the project was renamed again to Mozilla Firefox. The name "Firefox" (a reference to the red panda) was chosen for its similarity to "Firebird", and its uniqueness in the computing industry. To ensure that no further name changes would be necessary, the Mozilla Foundation began the process of registering Firefox as a trademark with the United States Patent and Trademark Office in December 2003. This trademark process led to a delay of several months in the release of Firefox 0.8 when the foundation discovered that Firefox had already been registered as a trademark in the UK for Charlton Company software. The situation was resolved when the foundation was given a license to use Charlton's European trademark.

Firefox version 1.0 was released on November 9, 2004. The launch of version 1.0 was accompanied by "a respectable amount of pre-launch fervor" including a fan-organized campaign to run a full-page ad in The New York Times.

Although the Mozilla Foundation had intended to make the Mozilla Suite obsolete and replace it with Firefox, the Foundation continued to maintain the suite until April 12, 2006 because it had many corporate users and was bundled with other software. The Mozilla community (as opposed to the Foundation) continues to release new versions of the suite, using the product name SeaMonkey to avoid confusion with the original Mozilla Suite.

Firefox 1.5 

Firefox 1.5 was released on November 30, 2005. Originally, it was planned to have a version 1.1 at an earlier date as the new Firefox version after 1.0, with development on a later version (1.5) in a separate development branch, but during 2005 both branches and their feature sets were merged (the Mozilla Foundation abandoned the 1.1 release plan after the first two alpha builds), resulting in an official release date between the original dates planned for both versions.

Version 1.5 implemented a new Mac-like options interface, the subject of much criticism from Microsoft Windows and Linux users, with a "Sanitize" action to allow someone to clear their privacy-related information without manually clicking the "Clear All" button. In Firefox 1.5, a user could clear all privacy-related settings simply by exiting the browser or using a keyboard shortcut, depending on their settings. Moreover, the software update system was improved (with binary patches now possible). There were also improvements in the extension management system, with a number of new developer features. In addition, Firefox 1.5 had preliminary SVG 1.1 support.

Behind the screens, the new version resynchronized the code base of the release builds (as opposed to nightly builds) with the core "trunk", which contained additional features not available in 1.0, as it branched from the trunk around the 0.9 release. As such, there was a backlog of bug fixes between 0.9 and the release of 1.0, which were made available in 1.5.

There were also changes in operating system support. As announced on 23 June 2005 by the Mozilla Foundation, Firefox 1.1, which later became 1.5, and other new Mozilla products did no longer support Mac OS X v10.1, in order to improve the quality of Firefox releases on Mac OS X v10.2 and above. Firefox 1.5 is the final version to support Windows 95.

Alpha builds of Firefox 1.5 (id est, 1.1a1 and 1.1a2) did not carry Firefox branding; they were labelled "Deer Park" (which was Firefox 1.5's internal codename) and contained a different program icon. This was done to dissuade end-users from downloading preview versions, which are intended for developers only.

Firefox 2 

On October 24, 2006, Mozilla released Firefox 2. This version included updates to the tabbed browsing environment, the extensions manager, the GUI (Graphical User Interface), and the find, search and software update engines. It also implemented a new session restore feature, inline spell checking, and an anti-phishing feature which was implemented by Google as an extension and later merged into the program itself.

In December 2007, Firefox Live Chat was launched. It allowed users to ask volunteers questions through a system powered by Jive Software, with guaranteed hours of operation and the possibility of help after hours.

Firefox 2.0.0.20 was the final version that could run under an unmodified installation of Windows NT 4.0, Windows 98, and Windows Me. Subsequently, Mozilla Corporation announced it would not develop new versions of Firefox 2 after the 2.0.0.20 release, but continued Firefox 2 development as long as other programs, such as Thunderbird mail client, depended on it. The final internal release was 2.0.0.22, released in late April 2009.

Firefox 3 

Firefox 3 was released on June 17, 2008, by the Mozilla Corporation. Firefox 3 uses version 1.9 of the Mozilla Gecko layout engine for displaying web pages. This version fixes many bugs, improves standard compliance, and implements new web APIs. Other new features include a redesigned download manager, a new "Places" system for storing bookmarks and history, and separate themes for different operating systems.

Development stretches back to the first Firefox 3 beta (under the codename 'Gran Paradiso') which had been released several months earlier on November 19, 2007, and was followed by several more beta releases in spring 2008 culminating in the June release. Firefox 3 had more than 8 million unique downloads the day it was released, setting a Guinness World Record.

Firefox 3.5 

Version 3.5, codenamed Shiretoko, adds a variety of new features to Firefox. Initially numbered Firefox 3.1, Mozilla developers decided to change the numbering of the release to 3.5 in order to reflect a significantly greater scope of changes than originally planned. The final release was on June 30, 2009. The changes included much faster performance thanks to an upgrade to SpiderMonkey JavaScript engine called TraceMonkey and rendering improvements, and support for the <video> and <audio> tags as defined in the HTML5 specification, with a goal to offer video playback without being encumbered by patent problems associated with many video technologies. Cross-site XMLHttpRequests (XHR), which can allow for more powerful web applications and an easier way to implement mashups, are also implemented in 3.5. A new global JSON object contains native functions to efficiently and safely serialize and deserialize JSON objects, as specified by the ECMAScript 3.1 draft. Full CSS 3 selector support has been added. Firefox 3.5 uses the Gecko 1.9.1 engine, which includes a few features that were not included in the 3.0 release. Multi-touch touchpad support was also added to the release, including gesture support like pinching for zooming and swiping for back and forward. Firefox 3.5 also features an updated logo.

Firefox 3.6 

Version 3.6, released on January 21, 2010, uses the Gecko 1.9.2 engine and includes several interface improvements, such as "personas". This release was referred to as 3.2 before 3.1 was changed to 3.5. The codename for this version was Namoroka. This is the last major, official version to run on PowerPC-based Macintoshes.

One minor update to Firefox 3.6, version 3.6.4 (code-named Lorentz) is the first minor update to make non-intrusive changes other than minor stability and security fixes. It adds Out of Process Plugins (OOPP), which runs plugins in a separate process, allowing Firefox to recover from plugin crashes. Firefox 3.6.6 lengthens the amount of time a plugin is allowed to be unresponsive before the plugin quits.

Firefox 4 

On October 13, 2006, Brendan Eich, Mozilla's then-Chief-Technology-Officer, wrote about the plans for "Mozilla 2", referring to the most comprehensive iteration (since its creation) of the overall platform on which Firefox and other Mozilla products run. Most of the objectives were gradually incorporated into Firefox through versions 3.0, 3.5, and 3.6. The largest changes, however, were planned for Firefox 4.

After five "Alpha" releases, twelve "Beta" releases, and two "Release Candidate" versions, Firefox 4 was released on March 22, 2011, originally Firefox 3.7 (Gecko 1.9.3) during its alpha stage, brought a new user interface and is said to be faster. Early mockups of the new interface on Windows, Mac OS X, and Linux were first made available in July 2009. Other new features included improved notifications, tab groups, "switch to tab" where opened tabs can be searched through the address bar, application tabs, a redesigned add-on manager, integration with Firefox Sync, and support for multi-touch displays.

Firefox 4 was based on the Gecko 2.0 engine, which added or improved support for HTML5, CSS3, WebM, and WebGL. It also included a new JavaScript engine (JägerMonkey) and better XPCOM APIs.

See also

 GNU IceCat
 History of free and open-source software
 History of Mozilla Application Suite
 Mozilla software rebranded by Debian

Notes

References

Further reading

 Eich, Brendan (2005). Branch Plan. In Mozilla Wiki. Retrieved December 21, 2005.

External links
 Mozilla Firefox release notes for each version
 Mozilla Firefox developer release notes for each version
 Releases - MozillaWiki
 unofficial changelogs for Firefox releases,  Jesse Ruderman (last updated in 2008)
 history of the Mozilla logo by Jamie Zawinski
 
 Firefox browser for web 2.0 age, BBC News

Firefox
Firefox
Firefox
Firefox